Free spectral range (FSR) is the spacing in optical frequency or wavelength between two successive reflected or transmitted optical intensity maxima or minima of an interferometer or diffractive optical element.

The reason is that these different terms often refer to the bandwidth or linewidth of an emitted source respectively.

In general 

The free spectral range (FSR) of a cavity in general is given by 

or, equivalently,

These expressions can be derived from the resonance condition  by expanding  in Taylor series.

Given that , the FSR (in wavelength) is given by

being  is the group index of the media within the cavity.
or, equivalently, 

where  is the speed of light in vacuum.

If the dispersion of the material is negligible, i.e. , then the two expressions above reduce to 

and 

A simple intuitive interpretation of the FSR is that it is the inverse of the roundtrip time :

In wavelength, the FSR is given by

where  is the vacuum wavelength of light. For a linear cavity, such as the Fabry-Pérot interferometer

Diffraction gratings 

The free spectral range of a diffraction grating is the largest wavelength range for a given order that does not overlap the same range in an adjacent order.

Fabry–Pérot interferometer 
In a Fabry–Pérot interferometer or etalon, the wavelength separation between adjacent transmission peaks is called the free spectral range of the etalon and is given by

More often FSR is quoted in frequency, rather than wavelength units:

The FSR is related to the full-width half-maximum δλ of any one transmission band by a quantity known as the finesse:

where  is the coefficient of finesse, and R is the reflectivity of the mirrors.

This is commonly approximated (for R > 0.5) by

References

Physical optics